Tímea Babos and Jessica Pegula were the defending champions, but Babos chose not to participate. Pegula partnered up with Eugenie Bouchard, but they lost in the Quarterfinals to Macall Harkins and Nicole Rottmann.

Gabriela Dabrowski and Alla Kudryavtseva won the title with a 6–2, 6–2 win over Sharon Fichman and Marie-Ève Pelletier.

Seeds

Draw

References 
 Main draw

Challenger Banque Nationale de Saguenay
Challenger de Saguenay